Operation 40 was the code name for a Central Intelligence Agency-sponsored counterintelligence group composed of Cuban exiles. The group was formed to seize control of the Cuban government after the Bay of Pigs Invasion. Operation 40 continued to operate unofficially until disbanded in 1970 due to allegations that an aircraft that was carrying cocaine and heroin in support of the group crashed in California.

It was approved by President Dwight D. Eisenhower in March 1960, after the January 1959 Cuban Revolution, and was presided over by Vice President Richard Nixon.

Origins
On 11 December 1959, following the Cuban Revolution of January 1959, Colonel J.C. King, chief of the CIA's Western Hemisphere Division, sent a confidential memorandum to CIA director Allen W. Dulles. King argued that in Cuba there existed a "far-left dictatorship, which if allowed to remain will encourage similar actions against U.S. holdings in other Latin American countries."

The group was presided over by then-Vice President Richard M. Nixon and included Admiral Arleigh Burke, Livingston Merchant of the State Department, National Security Adviser Gordon Gray, as well as Dulles himself.

Tracy Barnes functioned as operating office of the Cuban Task Force. He called a meeting on 18 January 1960, in his temporary office near the Lincoln Memorial.

On 17 March 1960, President Eisenhower signed a U.S. National Security Council directive on the anti-Cuban covert action program authorizing the CIA to organize, train, and equip Cuban refugees as a guerrilla force to overthrow the government of Cuban prime minister Fidel Castro.

Operations
Operation 40 was not only involved in sabotage operations. One associate of the group, although never a member, Frank Sturgis, allegedly told author Mike Canfield: "this assassination group (Operation 40) would upon orders, naturally, assassinate either members of the military or the political parties of the foreign country that you were going to infiltrate, and if necessary some of your own members who were suspected of being foreign agents...We were concentrating strictly in Cuba at that particular time." The group sought to incite civil war in Cuba against the government of prime minister Fidel Castro. "In October 1960, they realize that this project has failed, and that is when Brigade 2506" was created, a CIA-sponsored group made up of 1,511 Cuban exiles who fought in the April 1961 Bay of Pigs Invasion.

On 17 April 1961, Vicente León León, with other members of Operation 40, landed at the Bay of Pigs via the CIA-chartered freighter Atlántico. He was killed in action.

In popular culture
Operation 40 is a playable faction in the video game Call of Duty: Black Ops. Within the game's campaign mode, there is heavy implication that the main protagonist and Operation 40 operative Alex Mason was involved in the assassination of President Kennedy.

See also

 Brigade 2506
 Assassination attempts on Fidel Castro
 Richard M. Bissell, Jr.
 Cuban Power
 Cuban Project
 Echo 31
 Guillermo Hernández-Cartaya

Notes

Bibliography
Bohning, Don. 2005. The Castro Obsession: U.S. Covert Operations Against Cuba, 1959–1965. p. 303 
Rodriguez, Juan Carlos. 1999. Bay of Pigs and the CIA. Ocean Press Melbourne.

External links
 Bay of Pigs, 40 Years After: Chronology at The National Security Archive via George Washington University

Central Intelligence Agency operations
Cold War intelligence operations
Cuba–United States relations
Opposition to Fidel Castro